Clifton Powell (born March 16, 1956) is an American actor who primarily plays supporting roles in films, such as in Ray (2004), for which he received an NAACP Image Award for Outstanding Supporting Actor in a Motion Picture nomination.

Career

Powell has appeared in more than one hundred films, beginning in the 1980s. His credits include Menace II Society (1993), Dead Presidents (1995), Why Do Fools Fall in Love (1998), Rush Hour (1998), Next Friday (2000), and its 2002 sequel, Friday After Next, Woman Thou Art Loosed (2004), and Ray (2004). He played Martin Luther King Jr. in the 1999 television film Selma, Lord, Selma. Powell also has had many supporting roles in smaller direct-to-video films in 2000s and 2010s.

On television, Powell had the recurring roles on Roc, South Central, and Army Wives, and well as guest-starred on In the Heat of the Night, Murder, She Wrote, NYPD Blue, CSI: Crime Scene Investigation, and House MD. In 2016, Powell was cast as main antagonist in the Bounce TV first prime time soap opera, Saints & Sinners opposite Vanessa Bell Calloway and Gloria Reuben.

Powell is also known for his voice acting role as Big Smoke in the 2004 video game Grand Theft Auto: San Andreas.

In 2017, Powell appeared in the second season of My Step Kidz.

Personal life
Powell was born in Washington, D.C., and grew up in Mayfair Mansions in Northeast D.C. Attended HD Woodson Senior High School. He transferred and graduated from the Duke Ellington School of the Arts. Powell is married to Kimberly, with whom he has two children.

Filmography

Film

Television

Video games

References

External links

1956 births
Living people
20th-century American male actors
21st-century American male actors
20th-century African-American people
21st-century African-American people
African-American male actors
American male film actors
American male television actors
American male voice actors
American male video game actors
Male actors from Washington, D.C.